Trustin van 't Loo (born 25 May 2004) is a Dutch professional footballer who plays for the Under-21 squad of SC Heerenveen.

Club career 
Trustin van 't Loo joined SC Heerenveen at the age of nine, from Unicum, an amateur club in Lelystad. He signed his first professional contract with the club in June 2021.

Van 't Loo made his professional debut for Heerenveen on the 5 February 2022, replacing Anthony Musaba during a 2–0 away Eredivisie loss to Fortuna Sittard.

References

External links

2004 births
Living people
Dutch footballers
Association football forwards
Footballers from Lelystad
SC Heerenveen players
Eredivisie players